Taylor Township, Indiana may refer to:

 Taylor Township, Greene County, Indiana
 Taylor Township, Harrison County, Indiana
 Taylor Township, Howard County, Indiana
 Taylor Township, Owen County, Indiana

See also
Taylor Township (disambiguation)

Indiana township disambiguation pages